Jafar Aurelio Miguel Arias (born 16 June 1995) is a Curaçaoan professional footballer who plays as a forward for Helmond Sport.

Club career
Arias played for FC Groningen before joining Dordrecht in summer 2015.

On 29 August 2021, he signed a one-year contract with Argeș Pitești in Romania.

International
He made his Curaçao national football team debut on 5 June 2019, in a 2019 King's Cup game against India, as a starter.

Honours

International
Curaçao
 King's Cup: 2019

References

External links
 
 

1995 births
Living people
People from Willemstad
Curaçao footballers
Curaçao international footballers
Dutch footballers
Dutch people of Curaçao descent
Association football forwards
FC Groningen players
FC Dordrecht players
FC Emmen players
VVV-Venlo players
FC Argeș Pitești players
Eredivisie players
Eerste Divisie players
Liga I players
2019 CONCACAF Gold Cup players
Curaçao expatriate footballers
Expatriate footballers in Romania
Curaçao expatriate sportspeople in Romania